Ancylolomia lentifascialis is a moth in the family Crambidae. It was described by George Hampson in 1919. It is found in South Africa, where it has been recorded from the province of Gauteng.

References

Endemic moths of South Africa
Ancylolomia
Moths described in 1919
Moths of Africa